The 1871 Ripon by-election was held on 15 February 1871.  The by-election was held due to the resignation of the incumbent MP of the Liberal Party, Lord John Hay.  It was won by the Liberal candidate Sir Henry Knight Storks.

References

1871 elections in the United Kingdom
1871 in England
19th century in Yorkshire
Politics of the Borough of Harrogate
History of Ripon
By-elections to the Parliament of the United Kingdom in North Yorkshire constituencies
Politics of Ripon